Prentice Marcellus McCray, Jr. (born March 1, 1951 in Los Angeles, California) is a former American football safety in the National Football League. He was drafted by the Detroit Lions in the 8th round of the 1973 NFL Draft after playing collegiately at Arizona State. He was cut by Detroit during training camp in 1973 and did not play that entire year. The follow spring, the New England Patriots signed him as a free agent.

McCray was selected to the 1974 NFL All-Rookie Team as a member of the Patriots, starting all 14 games with three interceptions for 61 yards and a fumble recovery. His best and most memorable season was in 1976. During a game versus the New York Jets on November 21st at Shea Stadium, he intercepted Joe Namath twice and ran back both interceptions for touchdowns totaling 118 yards. He was named to the Patriots 70’s All-Decade team in 2009.

External links
New England Patriots bio

1951 births
Living people
Players of American football from Los Angeles
American football safeties
Arizona State Sun Devils football players
New England Patriots players
Detroit Lions players